This is an alphabetic list of defunct instant messaging platforms, showing the name, when it was discontinued and the type of client.

AOL Instant Messenger, 1997-2017
BBM, 2005-2019
ChatON, 2011-2015
Emesene, 2013 – MSNP (Microsoft Notification Protocol or Mobile Status Notification Protocol)
FireChat, 2014-2018
Gizmo5, 2005-2011 – Multi protocol
GMX Multi Messenger 2006-2008
Google Allo, 2016-2019
Google Hangouts, 2013-2022
Hike Messenger, 2012-2021
iChat, 2002-2012
Meebo, 2005-2012
Microsoft Messenger service, 1999-2014
Mxit, 2005-2016
MySpaceIM, 2006-2009
Odigo Messenger, 2002-2004
OoVoo, 2007-2017
PowWow, 1994-2001
Skype Qik, 2014-2016
Surespot , - 2022
Talk City, 2002
Upptalk, 2010-2017
Xfire, 2003-2015
Yahoo! Messenger, 1998-2018

Instant Messaging